Xantphos is an organophosphorus compound derived from the heterocycle xanthene.  It is used as a bidentate diphosphine ligand and is noteworthy for having a particularly wide bite angle (108°). Such ligands are useful in the hydroformylation of alkenes. Illustrative of its wide bite angle, it forms both cis and trans adducts of platinum(II) chloride. In the latter context, xantphos is classified as a trans-spanning ligand.  A related bidentate ligand with a greater bite angle is spanphos.

The ligand is prepared by double directed lithiation of 9,9-dimethylxanthene with sec-butyllithium followed by treatment with chlorodiphenylphosphine.

References

Diphosphines